Glassman is a surname. Notable people with the surname include:

Andrew Glassman, American television producer and founder of Glassman Media
Barry Glassman (born 1962), American state politician
Caroline Duby Glassman (1922–2013), American jurist
Cynthia Glassman, American government official
Harry P. Glassman (1928–1981), American jurist
Howard Glassman (born 1960), Canadian radio personality
James K. Glassman (born 1947), American libertarian conservative editorialist, journalist and author
Jon D. Glassman (born 1944), Former .S. State Dept. Official famous for writing El Salvador "White Paper" advocating U.S. intervention in Nicaragua
Tetsugen Bernard Glassman (1939–2018), American roshi and pioneer in the American Zen Movement

See also
Glasman
Justice Glassman (disambiguation)

Jewish surnames